Prince Lerotholi Seeiso (born 18 April 2007) is a member of the royal family of Lesotho and the current heir apparent to the throne.

Prince Lerotholi Mohato Bereng Seeiso was born at Maseru Private Hospital in the capital Maseru and is the third child and only son of King Letsie III of Lesotho and Queen 'Masenate Mohato Seeiso. He has two older sisters, the Princesses Senate and 'M'aSeeiso. Prince Lerotholi was named after Lerotholi, the Paramount Chief of Basuto from 1891 to 1905.

Prince Lerotholi was christened as "David" in the Saint Louis Church in Matsieng on 2 June 2007 by Archbishop of Maseru Bernard Mohlalisi, the head of the Catholic Church in Lesotho. The Principal Chief of Likhoele, Lerotholi Seeiso, stood as the Prince's godfather.

Ancestry

See also 
 List of current heirs apparent

References

2007 births
Living people
Royal children
Lesotho royalty
Lesotho Roman Catholics
House of Moshesh
People from Maseru
Heirs apparent
Sons of kings